Neelaps calonotos, also known commonly as the black-striped burrowing snake, the black-striped snake, and the western black-striped snake, is a species of venomous burrowing  snake  endemic to Australia. The specific epithet calonotos ("beautiful-backed") refers to the patterning on the upper surface of the body.

Description
Females are larger than males. Dorsally, it is reddish-orange, with a narrow black stripe along the back. The belly is whitish. Three black patches cover the snout, top of the head, and the nape.

Reproduction
Neelaps calonotos is oviparous, with an average clutch size of four (range 2–6).

Behaviour and diet
Neelaps calonotos is nocturnal, staying in loose sand during the day and preying on small animals such as lizards at night.

Geographic range and habitat
Neelaps calonotos occurs in coastal south-western Western Australia. It lives in dunes as well as open woodlands and shrublands with sandy soils.

References

Further reading
Boulenger GA (1896). Catalogue of the Snakes in the British Museum (Natural History). Volume III., Containing the Colubridæ (Opisthoglyphæ and Proteroglyphæ), Amblycephalidæ, and Viperidæ. London: Trustees of the British Museum (Natrural History). (Taylor and Francis, printers). xiv + 727 pp. + Plates I–XXV. (Furina calonota, p. 407).
Cogger HG (2014). Reptiles and Amphibians of Australia, Seventh Edition. Clayton, Victoria, Australia: CSIRO Publishing. xxx + 1,033 pp. .
Duméril A-M-C, Bibron G, Duméril A[-H-A] (1854). Erpétologie générale ou histoire naturelle complète des reptiles. Tome septième [Volume 7]. Deuxième partie [Part 2]. Comprenant l'histoire des serpents venimeux. Paris: Roret. xii + pp. 781–1536. (Furina calonotos, new species, pp. 1241–1242).
Glauert L (1960). A Handbook of the Snakes of Western Australia, Second Edition. Perth: Western Australian Naturalists' Club. 62 pp.
Sanders KL, Lee MSY, Leys R, Foster R, Keogh JS (2008). "Molecular phylogeny and divergence dates for Australasian elapids and sea snakes (hydrophiinae): evidence from seven genes for rapid evolutionary radiations". Journal of Evolutionary Biology 21 (3): 682–695.
Wilson S, Swan G (2013). A Complete Guide to Reptiles of Australia, Fourth Edition. Sydney: New Holland Publishers. 522 pp. .

calonotus
Snakes of Australia
Endemic fauna of Australia
Reptiles of Western Australia
Taxa named by André Marie Constant Duméril
Taxa named by Gabriel Bibron
Taxa named by Auguste Duméril
Reptiles described in 1854